The San Rafael Ranch, formerly known as the Greene Ranch, is a historic cattle ranch located in the San Rafael Valley about a mile and a half north of Lochiel, Arizona, near the international border with Sonora, Mexico.

History
The land that is now the San Rafael Ranch was originally an old Mexican land grant called San Rafael de la Zanja, which was sold to the cattle baron Colin Cameron and a few of his partners in the 1880s. Cameron built a two-story house to live in soon after, but it burned to the ground Christmas Eve when it caught fire from a candle Christmas tree in 1899. A year later Cameron built a new three-story brick house, even larger and more luxurious than the original, although he lived in it for only a short time. After losing a legal battle to his neighbor over land rights in 1903, Cameron decided the ranch was not worth the trouble and sold it to his rival. Colonel William Cornell Greene, who owned the large copper mines to the southeast, in Cananea, Sonora. Colonel Greene acquired many properties over the years, including some 600,000 acres of ranch land on both sides of the international border. The San Rafael Ranch House became the headquarters for the Greene Cattle Company, which raised tens-of-thousands of hereford cattle that Collin Cameron brought from New York and horses to go with them. The Greene Cattle Company was so successful it even attracted the attention of Pancho Villa, who raided the San Rafael Ranch for horses on more than one occasion in the early 1910s.

Colonel Greene died in 1911 and the ranch was inherited by his daughter, Florence Sharp, and her husband. In the early 1950s, the ranch acquired national attention when it was selected as the filming location for the classic Western film "Oklahoma!", starring Gordon MacRae and Shirley Jones. Shortly thereafter, Florence Sharp and her family began the long process of having the ranch house and surrounding rangeland preserved for future generations. The ranching era finally came to an end in 1998, following the death of Florence Sharp and the sale of the ranch to The Nature Conservancy. In 1999 Arizona State Parks purchased 3,557 acres of the property, including the ranch house, for use as a Natural Area. Arizona State Parks also purchased a conservation easement on the remainder of the original ranch. The San Rafael Ranch includes 18,500 deeded acres and a grazing preference established in 1999 on the natural area held by Arizona State Parks. In 2008, the ranch headquarters was designated a National Historic District, but it is currently not open to the public.

Historic district
The historic district consists of the main ranch house and several ancillary buildings including a machine/blacksmith shop, two barns, corrals, and other structures used in livestock operations.  The district is significant both for the French Colonial Revival style of the ranch house, unusual for a rural ranch in Arizona; and as an example of the ranching industry in Arizona from 1884 to 1957.

Gallery

See also

 Hale Ranch
 San Bernardino Ranch
 Empire Ranch
 Faraway Ranch Historic District
 Brown Canyon Ranch
 National Register of Historic Places listings in Santa Cruz County, Arizona

References

History of Santa Cruz County, Arizona
Ranches on the National Register of Historic Places in Arizona
Historic districts on the National Register of Historic Places in Arizona
National Register of Historic Places in Santa Cruz County, Arizona
Buildings and structures in Santa Cruz County, Arizona
1884 establishments in Arizona Territory
Houses completed in 1900